Xylomelum angustifolium, the sandplain woody pear, is a tree species  in the family Proteaceae, endemic to Western Australia. A mature Xylomelum angustifolium grows from 2 to 7 metres, though trees up to 10m have been observed. Produces cream flowers between December and February though flowering can commence as early as September in its northern range.

References

angustifolium
Proteales of Australia
Trees of Australia
Trees of Mediterranean climate
Eudicots of Western Australia
Endemic flora of Western Australia